The Ministry of Finance is a government ministry of Grenada responsible for the management of public finances, economic planning and budgeting.

Ministers of Finance

See also
Government of Grenada
Eastern Caribbean Central Bank
Economy of Grenada

References

Politics of Grenada
Government of Grenada
Economy of Grenada
Grenada